Nicobar can refer to:

 Nicobar Islands
Car Nicobar
Great Nicobar Island
Little Nicobar
 Nicobar district

Animals

Nicobar shrew
Nicobar treeshrew
Nicobar long-tailed macaque
Nicobar flying fox
 Nicobar pigeon
 Nicobar megapode
Nicobar sparrowhawk
Nicobar parakeet
Nicobar bulbul
Central Nicobar serpent eagle
South Nicobar serpent eagle
Nicobar scops-owl
Nicobar crow